Horseshoe Beach is a town in Dixie County, Florida, United States.  The population was 169 at the 2010 census.

Geography

Horseshoe Beach is located in southern Dixie County at  (29.440547, –83.288776), on the Gulf of Mexico.

Demographics

As of the census of 2000, there were 206 people, 84 households, and 59 families residing in the town. The racial makeup of the town was 95.63% White and 4.37% African American. Hispanic or Latino of any race were 0.49% of the population.

There were 84 households, out of which 22.6% had children under the age of 18 living with them, 56.0% were married couples living together, 8.3% had a female householder with no husband present, and 28.6% were non-families. 25.0% of all households were made up of individuals, and 17.9% had someone living alone who was 65 years of age or older.  The average household size was 2.45 and the average family size was 2.88.

In the town, the population was spread out, with 24.3% under the age of 18, 6.3% from 18 to 24, 14.6% from 25 to 44, 27.2% from 45 to 64, and 27.7% who were 65 years of age or older.  The median age was 47 years. For every 100 females, there were 85.6 males.  For every 100 females age 18 and over, there were 92.6 males.
 
The median income for a household in the town was $33,750, and the median income for a family was $46,875. Males had a median income of $29,286 versus $25,313 for females. The per capita income for the town was $16,535.  About 17.2% of families and 22.3% of the population were below the poverty line, including 39.6% of those under the age of eighteen and 18.2% of those 65 or over.

Ancestry

 the largest self-reported ancestry groups in Horseshoe Beach, Florida are:

References

Towns in Dixie County, Florida
Towns in Florida
Populated coastal places in Florida on the Gulf of Mexico